Nawadih refers to a village in Bokaro district, Jharkhand, India

Nawadih also refers to:
Nawadih Satgawan, a village in Koderma district, Jharkhand, India
Nawadih, Markacho, a village in Koderma district, Jharkhand, India
Nawadih block, in Bokaro district, Jharkhand, India
Nawadih Airfield, in Gaya district, Bihar, India